The Guardian Angels is a non-profit international volunteer organization with the goal of unarmed crime prevention. The Guardian Angels organization was founded on February 13, 1979, in New York City by Curtis Sliwa. It later spread to over 130 cities and 13 countries worldwide.

Sliwa originally created the organization to combat widespread violence and crime on the New York City Subway system. The organization originally trained members to make citizen's arrests for violent crimes. The organization patrols the streets and neighborhoods without involving police or any outside authority, but also provides educational programs for schools and businesses.

History

In the beginning, New York City Mayor Ed Koch publicly opposed the group. Over the years, the controversy has died down and as citizen involvement and outreach has increased, there have been less public opposition to the group by administration officials. Ed Koch later reversed his stance on the organization, and former New York City Mayors Rudy Giuliani and Michael Bloomberg have publicly supported the group.

Rules and activities
The original and main Guardian Angels activity is "safety patrol" in which members walk the streets or ride transit. Guardian Angels must be in uniform to represent the organization.  They can be identified by their red berets and red jackets or white T-shirts with the red Guardian Angels logo of an eye inside a pyramid on a winged shield.

Chapters operate similarly to franchise networks supporting one another regionally under standard rules, regulations, and training. The Guardian Angels state that it is an equal opportunity organization that encourages diversity.

The organization accepts volunteers with no recent or serious criminal record and are not members of a gang or racial-hate group. To join the safety patrol program, members must be at least 16 years old; youth programs for younger applicants are offered. Safety Patrol members are prohibited from carrying weapons and are physically searched by each other before patrolling. They are trained in first aid and CPR, law, conflict resolution, communication, and basic martial arts. Members are paired up and follow the directions of a Patrol Leader. If their own or other citizens' lives or health are endangered, they are allowed to do whatever is lawful and necessary.

The Guardian Angels have also begun to include youth programs, teacher programs, disaster response, an Internet safety program called the CyberAngels, and self-defense courses, as well as community outreach addressing issues beyond crime.

The Guardian Angels do not demand or ask for money on the subway. In the 1980s when they were often seen on the subways, imitators would dress in clothing similar to the Guardian Angels' characteristic dress (including red berets), impersonate them, and solicit money.

CyberAngels
CyberAngels was founded in 1995 by Colin "Gabriel" Hatcher as an online "neighborhood watch." Originally the group monitored chat rooms directly with the intent of apprehending sexual predators. Later the group took what it had learned and changed its focus to educating police, schools, and families about online abuse and cyber crime. In 1998, CyberAngels received a Presidential Service Award. MacSupport.com founder Tony Ricciardi was an early member of the group.

Training

In 2009, at the Angels' 30th-anniversary celebration held in New York City and again in 2010 at the World Conference held in San Francisco, founder Curtis Sliwa announced the plan to develop Internet-based training for the organization.

One of the primary goals of the training is to reduce the liability potential for members and for the organization during their physical interventions of crime deterrence.

At the international conference held in Chicago Il, the Raven Method developed by member Fernan Vargas was adopted as the official defensive tactics training system for the organization. This change was signed into effect by Founder Curtis Sliwa, National Director Miguel Fuentes, and International Director Keiji Oda.

Chapters

Outside of New York City, the Guardian Angels first established chapters in Washington, D.C., New Orleans, Los Angeles, San Diego, San Francisco, Fresno, Chicago, Philadelphia, Boston, Denver, London, Toronto, Dallas, Tokyo, Houston, Cape Town, Auckland, Savannah, Seattle, and York. Subsequently, the organization established chapters in smaller cities, such as the cities of Springfield and Brockton, Massachusetts; Sacramento and Stockton, California; and Portland, Maine. In May 2011, a chapter was organized in Indianapolis. The Los Angeles, York, Pennsylvania, and Sacramento Chapters worked with official law enforcement officers and agencies.

The Tampa Bay region of Florida has always been an active area within the group's history. There have been two chapters serving the Tampa Bay area since the group was founded. The first Tampa chapter was established in 1984 and lasted until 1992. A second chapter was established in 1999. In 2017, when the Seminole Heights serial killer was active, the Tampa Bay chapter patrolled the streets of the Seminole Heights neighborhood to help relieve public fear.

The Guardian Angels have been active in Orlando, Florida, due to the increase in murder and crime rates.

In 2016, the Washington, DC chapter announced they would increase their presence on the DC Metro System following an increase in violent crime.

Outside the United States
Australia

 
A Guardian Angels chapter actively patrolled in Sydney in the early nineties but disbanded shortly.

A chapter was formed in Canberra, the capital city of Australia, in 2008, but has yet to begin patrolling. Some school and internet-safety programs have been conducted. The chapter was closed.

In 2017 a branch was formed in the city of Logan in Queensland. They started patrolling local parks but have since been patrolling the streets and other public places.
In 2019 Guardian Angels began patrols in Melbourne and closed 12 months later in 2020.

Canada

A Toronto chapter was originally formed in 1982 and ran until 1984.  A smaller chapter ran briefly in the Parkdale area of Toronto in 1992–1993 but disbanded. The 2005 Boxing Day shooting resulted in the death of teenager Jane Creba on a busy downtown street, and provoked renewed attention to law-and-order issues in Canada, and Curtis Sliwa stated that he had been contacted by many Torontonians interested in having a local chapter. On July 13, 2006, a new chapter of the Guardian Angels Canada was formed in Toronto. However, both mayor David Miller and police chief Bill Blair stated they were not interested in trying what had not worked twice before.  When Sliwa arrived with three other Angels, Miller declined to meet with them, stating that police work was best left to the police.  Despite the opposition of the mayor, community groups, and the police chief, the Toronto Chapter moved ahead.  2006 mayoral candidate Jane Pitfield expressed her support for the Guardian Angels as did former television anchor Peter Kent and former professional boxer (and now radio talk show host) Spider Jones. Toronto's first group of Guardian Angels hit the streets Thursday, July 13 for their inaugural patrol in the city's downtown core. The group's official launch in Toronto came just two days after members were forced to move their graduation ceremony from a seniors residence on Dundas Street.

A Vancouver chapter was in operation as of November 2006.  There was a chapter there in the early 1980s.  Some of the alumni from that group are assisting with the new chapter.

An attempt to organize a chapter in Ottawa failed after the police and city refused to cooperate plus a negative reaction and lack of interest from the majority of its population.

A Calgary chapter was set up, with the first group finishing its training in March 2007.

A Halifax chapter is in operation as of May 2008.  Recent outbreaks of violent crime in Halifax had prompted citizens to contact the Guardian Angels, urging them to start a chapter.

Germany
In 1993 local Guardian Angels have been founded in several German cities like Berlin and Hamburg to patrol the local S-Bahn and U-Bahn facilities. Currently the Guardian Angels are still active in Hanover and have been renamed to Schutzengel, which is the German translation of the English denomination.

Japan
A local organization of the Guardian Angels was formed in Japan in 1996.  The Guardian Angels Japan has chapters in most of the major cities and is second only to America in membership and activities.  Keiji Oda, the founder and president of the Guardian Angels Japan, joined the Boston and New York City chapters in the 1980s.  The Guardian Angels concept faced opposition in Japan, but Oda succeeded in convincing Japanese officials that the organization would be run by Japanese members for the Japanese people, and the principles of the organization were not just American but universal.  Official acceptance culminated with a meeting with the Japanese Prime Minister Junichiro Koizumi in 2005.  The Guardian Angels were the first community organization in Japan to be awarded non-profit status.

Mexico
In 2007, a chapter formed in Mexico City led by the Canadian professional wrestler Vampiro.

New Zealand
In January 2006, the Guardian Angels opened its New Zealand Headquarters in Henderson, a suburb of West Auckland, New Zealand. The New Zealand National Director was Andy "Chieftain" Cawston.

New Zealand's inaugural Guardian Angels Patrol was held on January 13, 2006.  The Guardian Angels were active in South Auckland for a short while.

On August 30, 2007, Curtis Sliwa graduated the Auckland CBD Chapter, led by Anna "Kimodo" Cruse.  This Chapter's first official Patrol was on the following evening.

Members of the Wellington Chapter held their inaugural training and orientation Patrol on October 6, 2006, in the Auckland CBD.

Within New Zealand, The International Alliance of Guardian Angels was recognized and registered as a Charitable Trust for tax purposes. Their headquarters were in the Waitakere Community Center, Ratanui Street, Henderson. In 2016 the New Zealand chapters disbanded.

The Philippines
Cybertanod, Role Model Cop, and the Barangay PeaceKeeping Action Team (BPAT) program of The Philippine National Police are some of the contributions of The Guardian Angels Philippines Chapter in Police organization.  Joint police programs of the Guardian Angels resulted in national awards for officers and local police stations where the Guardian Angels works.  The chapter covered Southern Mindanao and recently expanded into Northern Luzon.  Today, the Philippines Chapter aims to spread the program in the Southeast Asia region and is currently developing an independent Citizen Police Organization concept for the region.  The local chapter presently gathers support to host the 1st Joint Police and Guardian Angels Annual International Citizen Safety Patrol as its beyond border initiatives on Guardian Angels violence prevention — Global Public Safety awareness campaign.  The effort in Southeast Asia is under the watch of Mike Zarate as National Director for Philippines.

South Africa
The Guardian Angels South African Chapter was started by Carl Viljoen in 2004 in Cape Town.  Other chapters are in Kuilsrivier in the Western Cape and Potchefstroom, North West Province.

United Kingdom

In London, the Guardian Angels are an independent, non-profit, non-political voluntary organization whose main purpose is to tackle violent crime, act as positive role models for young people, and serve communities in the UK, since its formation on 14 May 1989.  By 2007 their main numbers had dwindled to almost zero.  In the United Kingdom, the law requires that people use only "reasonable force" as appropriate to the situation, which leads Guardian Angel training to focus on using the minimum possible force, and to only use force to prevent a dangerous situation from escalating. All violent crimes are reported to the police, and intervention leading to citizens' arrests (legal in Britain) or use of force is only employed in extreme cases. Guardian Angels in the UK are unarmed but all fully trained in self defence, first aid and law for personal and community protection.

The Manchester Chapter was established around 1991 and ceased operating in 1996.  The Chapter was run by Ian "Mach One" McMahon and then Amanda "Lynx" Quinn. Steve "Shuriken" Smith was the fundraising coordinator and dealt with the final patrols and oversaw the closing of the headquarters.

The London Chapter seemed dormant for several years.

Controversies
In 1992, Guardian Angels founder Curtis Sliwa issued a public apology for faking several subway rescues in the 1980s in order to get publicity for the group. 

In October 2020, various individuals running for the New York City Council expressed concerns that the presence of the Guardian Angels might bring tensions to their neighborhoods.

In February 2021, Patrick Bobilin, a candidate for the New York State Assembly, posted a video to Twitter showing members of the Guardian Angels allegedly harassing and attacking protesters, including Bobilin, as they returned from a Stonewall Inn protest.

In popular culture

The 1981 CBS made-for-TV movie We're Fighting Back, featuring Bronx-born Ellen Barkin, was based on the Guardian Angels.
In a 1981 episode of Archie Bunker's Place, Guardian Angels intervene when they assume Archie is bothering a young woman, who is in fact his niece.
The 1982 song "Red Angel Dragnet" by The Clash was inspired by the murder of Frank Melvin, and sarcastically praises the Guardian Angels for their work as vigilantes.
"Footsteps", a short comics story written by British writer Alan Moore and drawn by Joe Orlando for Secret Origins #10, uses a schism in the Guardian Angels (identified in the story as "Subway Angels") as a modern-day metaphor for the War in Heaven. One of the story's protagonists is a young Angel reluctant to side with either the Angels' leadership or the subway "survivalists" looking to subvert the leadership and is as a result spurned and beaten by both groups. He is subsequently comforted by the Phantom Stranger, whom Moore identifies as a literal angel that neglected to take sides during the "real" War in Heaven.
In season 3 of 21 Jump Street, a group of young vigilantes called the "Street Rangers", try to clean the streets of crime in a tough neighborhood.  In that episode, their goal is to bring down an untouchable drug dealer, without knowing about the young undercover cops trying to convict him first.  The logo on the uniforms that the Rangers wear is inspired by the Guardian Angels' – instead of wearing red, they wear black.
Professional wrestler Ray Traylor wrestled under the moniker "The Guardian Angel" in WCW from 1993 to 1995 after his character "The Boss" was deemed too similar to his WWF character "The Big Bossman", whom Traylor also portrayed.  Traylor wore the trademark red jacket and beret of the organization, as well as their T-shirts when competing.  Traylor, a former corrections officer, actually went through Guardian Angel training and was inducted into the Angels as part of the gimmick.
The Guardian Angels are featured in a FirstRun.tv Network reality TV series called Angels in Action. In the first episode, Curtis Sliwa opens the series, and it follows the Philadelphia Guardian Angels as they spread information about a neighborhood rapist and make a drug bust.  Later on, it follows the Guardian Angels in Atlantic City as they investigate a massage parlor, they believe is a front for illegal prostitution, and actually find a way to get inside.
A trio of Guardian Angels were background characters in a Marvel Comics Punisher story. They were introduced in one panel, before the villain of the sequence (HELP!) murdered them in cold blood, on the subway.
The Guardian Angels also got an entry in the Marvel Super Heroes roleplaying game Deluxe City campaign set.
"The Guardian Angel Is Watching Over Us", a tribute to the Guardian Angels, is a soul-funk-disco song recorded in New York City in 1979 by the Golden Flamingo Orchestra featuring Margo Williams.
In an episode of the 1982–1983 game show Child's Play, a boy given the task of describing the term "Guardian angel" actually described members of this organization.
Season 2, Episode 26 of In Living Color debuted a parody of a wannabe Guardian Angel character— "Dickie Peterson: Cherub of Justice" (portrayed by Jim Carrey)— which first aired 1 September 1991.
Featured in Season 12, Episode 13 of Mysteries at the Museum, "When Twain Met Sawyer and More" which first aired November 3, 2016.
Dom Joly has also portrayed a Guardian Angel for comedic purposes on British public transport in at least one episode of Trigger Happy TV.
In a 2022 episode of Saturday Night Live, LCD Soundsystem makes a cameo appearance as the Guardian Angels during the "Subway Churro" sketch, with the band's co-founder, James Murphy, portraying Sliwa.
The Guardian Angels are featured in season two of Russian Doll.
The Guardian Angels are mentioned in the second episode of Bubblegum Crisis Tokyo 2040.
In the S3 E14 episode of It's Always Sunny in Philadelphia episode "Bums: Making a Mess All Over the City"; Mac and Dee form a neighborhood watch group, and Mac buys them uniforms modeled after the Guardian Angels claiming: "The Guardian Angels wore the same exact outfit when they cleaned up the streets of New York City in the 1970s" to which Dee responds "We look like Rerun..."

See also
 City Angels
 Public transport security
 Lisa Evers

References

External links

 
 Guardian Angels Japanese chapters

Non-profit organizations based in New York City
Organizations established in 1979
Civil crime prevention
1979 establishments in New York City
Neighborhood watch organizations